Catherine "Kitty" Muriel Rob  (21 February 1906 – 6 February 1975) was a British botanist.

Biography
Rob was born in 1906 at Catton Hall near Thirsk and lived there her whole life.

Rob was a self taught botanist. She joined the Wild Flower Society at age 17 and remained involved with it throughout her life. She served in the army during the Second World War with the rank of corporal and was based at Catterick Garrison, where she worked as a cook. Rob gave lectures on botany to many learned societies and ran WEA courses in botany.

Rob joined the Yorkshire Naturalists' Union in 1934 and became the recorder for flowering plants in North Yorkshire in 1935, remaining in this role for 37 years. She variously served as Secretary (1955-1958) of the Botanical section of the YNU, as its Chairman in 1970, and has President of the whole Union in 1969. Kit was a member of the Botanical Society of the British Isles and served as its vice-president from 1961 to 1963.  She also served as the Vice-President of the Yorkshire Philosophical Society.

In her later years she bred Cardigan Welsh Corgis, including a Best of Breed named 'Echium of Hezelclose' at Crufts in 1968.

Family
Rob had two brothers, one of who was named Charles. Rob was a carer for her mother and two aunties, all of whom also lived at Catton Hall.

Publications
Rob, C. M. 1963. "An Introduction to the Catalogue of the 'More Rare Wild Plants' which were to be found in the Castle Howard districts", Annual Report of the Council of the Yorkshire Philosophical Society for 1962. 20-31.
Dony, J. G., Rob, C. M., and Perring, F. 1974. English names of wild flowers, a recommended list of the Botanical Society of the British Isles.

References

1906 births
1975 deaths
Fellows of the Linnean Society of London
Members of the Yorkshire Philosophical Society
People from Thirsk
English botanists
Women botanists
Dog breeders
British women in World War II
Members of the Yorkshire Naturalists' Union

External Links

 Papers of Catherine Muriel Rob at the Borthwick Institute for Archives